Francisco Ladislao Ortega (born 19 April 1996) is an Argentine professional footballer who plays as a centre-back for Dominican club Atlético Pantoja.

Career
Ortega spent seven years in the academy of Colón, which preceded a spell with El Quillá. In 2013, Ortega completed a move to Atlético de Rafaela. He was moved into their senior squad ahead of the 2018–19 Primera B Nacional, with the defender making his professional debut after featuring for the remaining twenty-seven minutes of a home win over Olimpo on 19 October 2018; he had previously appeared in their first-team when he was an unused substitute for a Copa Argentina tie with Defensores de Belgrano in the preceding July. Ortega spent six months on loan with Central Norte in early 2019, making nine appearances.

After securing promotion with Central Norte, Ortega returned to Atlético de Rafaela in July 2019 - before terminating his contract thirteen months later. At the end of November 2020, Ortega once again signed with Central Norté. However, Ortega didn't play any official matches for the club after his return to the club, since he tested positive for Coronavirus in December.

Prior to the start of the Liga Rafaelina de Fútbol, Club Atlético 9 de Julio announced the arrival of Ortega. However, on 25 March 2022 it was confirmed, that Ortega had left 9 de Julio to join Dominican club Atlético Pantoja. A year later, in March 2022, Ortega then signed for Bosnian First League club Jedinstvo Bihać. He returned to Atlético Pantoja in June 2022 again.

Career statistics
.

References

External links

1996 births
Living people
Argentine footballers
Argentine expatriate footballers
Footballers from Santa Fe, Argentina
Association football defenders
Primera Nacional players
Club Atlético Colón footballers
Atlético de Rafaela footballers
Central Norte players
9 de Julio de Rafaela players
Atlético Pantoja players
NK Jedinstvo Bihać players
Argentine expatriate sportspeople in the Dominican Republic
Argentine expatriate sportspeople in Bosnia and Herzegovina
Expatriate footballers in the Dominican Republic
Expatriate footballers in Bosnia and Herzegovina